Kai Lung is a fictional character in a series of books by Ernest Bramah, consisting of The Wallet of Kai Lung (1900), Kai Lung's Golden Hours (1922), Kai Lung Unrolls His Mat (1928), The Moon of Much Gladness (1932; published in the US as The Return of Kai Lung), Kai Lung Beneath the Mulberry Tree (1940), Kai Lung: Six (1974) and Kai Lung Raises His Voice (2010).

Character introduction
Kai Lung is a Chinese storyteller whose travels and exploits serve mainly as excuses to introduce substories, which generally take up the majority of a Kai Lung book.

Character sketch

Motivations
Kai Lung is a man of very simple motivations; most frequently, he is animated by a desire for enough taels to be able to feed and clothe himself. Otherwise, his main motivation is love for his wife, Hwa-mei, and he seeks nothing more than a simple, sustainable lifestyle. Generally, he does not intrude in other people's affairs unless he thinks it necessary to teach them the rudiments of classical proportion with one of his fables.

Conflicts
This character usually comes into conflict with barbarians, bandits, and other people who are not classically educated, as well as various unscrupulous individuals who are intent on taking away his property.

In other authors
In The Stray Lamb by Thorne Smith, the character Mr. Lamb relaxes while reading Kai Lung.

Dorothy L. Sayers mentions him in several Lord Peter Wimsey novels:
 In chapter IV of Strong Poison, Wimsey says that Harriet Vane's ability to quote Kai Lung is a sign that they "should certainly get on together."
 In chapter XV of Gaudy Night, he tells her that Kai Lung is an author who suits his tastes: "My tastes are fairly catholic. It might easily have been Kai Lung or Alice in Wonderland or Machiavelli—".
 In chapter VII of Busman's Honeymoon Peter quotes from Kai Lung's Golden Hours to Superintendent Kirk: "... entrancing it is to wander through a garden of bright images..."

In 'He cometh and he passeth by' by H. Russell Wakefield, one of the principal characters reads The Wallet of Kai-Lung before retiring to bed.

Ford Madox Ford repeatedly quoted the allegedly Chinese proverb "It would be hypocrisy to seek for the person of the Sacred Emperor in a Low Tea House." It has been convincingly argued that Ford originally acquired this proverb from the Kai Lung novels of Ernest Bramah, and that Bramah had created it for Kai Lung, rather than quoting a genuine Chinese proverb.

References

 
Literary characters introduced in 1900
Characters in British novels of the 20th century
Fictional Chinese people in literature